Hangmen is a 1987 American action thriller film written and directed by J. Christian Ingvordsen, and marked the acting debut of actress Sandra Bullock.

Plot
The security agent of a US senator, Dick Biel, is responsible for responding to an assassination attempt. He accidentally kills several innocent bystanders with the team, during the operation.

Several years later, Rob Greene becomes the leader of the secret operations team that had been charged with protecting the senator, having information about a renegade CIA cell and that cell wants Greene and his information. He runs from the cell, so they attempt to kidnap Danny, Rob's estranged son as a hostage. In the process, they murder Danny's best friend, two of Rob Greene’s former team, Rob’s ex-wife and her new husband. The rest of the team get together to fight back, including the team member responsible for the deaths of bystanders years before. When the CIA cell kidnaps Lisa, Danny’s girlfriend, they are able to manipulate Danny into surrendering to them. Rob’s team then attacks the headquarters of the CIA cell in a rescue mission.

Trivia
Bullock is featured on the covers of later video releases as the headline star, capitalizing on her later stardom.

Cast
Rick Washburn as Rob Greene	
Doug Thomas as Dog Thompson	
Keith Bogart as Denny Greene	
"John Christian" (J. Christian Ingvordsen) as Bone Conn	
Sandra Bullock as Lisa Edwards	
David Henry Keller as Andrews	
Dan Lutsky as Joe Connelly	
"Sam Silver" (Dan Golden) as Reynolds	
Robert Khaleel as Draff	
Jake LaMotta as Moe Boone	
Kosmo Vinyl as Kosmo
Stu Day as Keeper
Dick Mel as Senator Dick Biel	
Amanda Zinsser as Caroline Fosterian

External links

1987 films
American action thriller films
1987 action thriller films
1980s English-language films
1980s American films